Year 1376 (MCCCLXXVI) was a leap year starting on Tuesday (link will display the full calendar) of the Julian calendar.

Events 
<onlyinclude>

January–December 
 
 March – The peace treaty between England and France is extended until April, 1377.
 March 31 – Pope Gregory XI excommunicates all members of the government of Florence, and places the city under an interdict. 
 April 28 – The Good Parliament begins in England (so called because its members attempted to reform the corrupt Royal Council on that date).
 May 3 – Olav IV Haakonsson is elected King Oluf II of Denmark, following the death of his grandfather, Valdemar IV, in 1375.
 June – Catherine of Siena visits Pope Gregory XI in Avignon, to attempt to persuade him to make peace with Florence, and move the Papacy back to Rome.
 June 7 – The dying Prince Edward summons his father, Edward III, and brother, John of Gaunt, and makes them swear to uphold the claim to the throne of his son Richard; Edward is the first "English" Prince of Wales not to become King of England. 
 July 10 – The Good Parliament is dissolved (at that time, it was the longest Parliament to have sat in England).
 August 12 – With the help of the Genoese, Byzantine co-emperor Andronicus IV Palaeologus invades Constantinople and dethrones his father, John V Palaeologus, as co-emperor. John V Palaeologus is taken prisoner.
 September – John of Gaunt summons religious reformer John Wyclif to appear before the Royal Council.
 November 20 – Richard of Bordeaux, son of the Black Prince, is created Prince of Wales in succession to his father.
 December 25 – John of Gaunt presents his nephew, Richard of Bordeaux, to the feudatories of the realm and swears to uphold Richard's right to succeed Edward III.

Dates Unknown 
 Acamapichtli becomes the first tlatoani of Tenochtitlan.

Births 
 November 9 – Edmund Mortimer, English nobleman and rebel (d. c. 1409)
 date unknown
 Gihwa, scholar in Korean Buddhism (d. 1433)
 Sofia of Bavaria, queen consort of Bohemia (d. 1425)
 Yusuf III, Sultan of Granada (d. 1417)

Deaths 
 January 24 – Richard FitzAlan, 10th Earl of Arundel, English military leader
 April 6 – Przecław of Pogorzela, Cardinal and Bishop of Wrocław (b. 1310)
 May 30 – Joan of Ponthieu, Dame of Epernon, French countess regent 
 June 8 – Edward, the Black Prince, son of King Edward III of England (b. 1330)
 July 22 – Simon Langham, Archbishop of Canterbury (b. 1310)
 September 30 – Adelaide of Vianden, German countess

References